The chiesa di Sant'Agostino (Church of St Augustine) is the second largest church in San Gimignano, Italy, after the Collegiata. It is owned by the Order of Saint Augustine.

Sant'Agostino is an imposing 13th century building. The interior is a large hall dominated by the seventeen-panel fresco cycle on The Life of St Augustine around the high altar, painted by Benozzo Gozzoli between 1463 and 1467. The altarpiece is the Coronation of the Virgin by Piero del Pollaiuolo (1483). There are a number of other frescoes in the church. The Cappella di San Bartolo houses the remains of the eponymous saint (1228–1300), a lay Franciscan who died of leprosy. The magnificent altar in the chapel is by Benedetto da Maiano.

External links

Benozzo Gozzoli: A Gallery of Frescoes

13th-century Roman Catholic church buildings in Italy
Roman Catholic churches in San Gimignano
Monasteries in Tuscany
San Gimignano